{{Automatic taxobox
| taxon = Dipoenura
| authority = Simon, 1909
| type_species = D. fimbriata
| type_species_authority = Simon, 1909
| subdivision_ranks = Species
| subdivision = 5, see text
| synonyms = 
Trichursa Simon, 1908<ref name=Levi1972>{{cite journal| last=Levi| first=H. W.| year=1972| title=Taxonomic-nomenclatural notes on misplaced theridiid spiders (Araneae: Theridiidae), with observations on Anelosimus| journal=Transactions of the American Microscopical Society| volume=91| page=534| doi=10.2307/3225482| jstor=3225482}}</ref>
| synonyms_ref = 
}}Dipoenura is a genus of comb-footed spiders that was first described by Eugène Louis Simon in 1909.

Species
 it contains five species, found in Asia and Sierra Leone:Dipoenura aplustra Zhu & Zhang, 1997 – ChinaDipoenura bukolana Barrion, Barrion-Dupo & Heong, 2013 – ChinaDipoenura cyclosoides (Simon, 1895) – Sierra Leone, China, LaosDipoenura fimbriata Simon, 1909 (type) – India, China, Vietnam, Indonesia (Krakatau), Korea, JapanDipoenura quadrifida'' Simon, 1909 – Vietnam

See also
 List of Theridiidae species

References

Araneomorphae genera
Spiders of Africa
Spiders of Asia
Theridiidae